SnorgTees is an American company based in the US state of Georgia, specializing in T-shirt  designs that reference popular culture or make humorous assertions about the wearer. Auburn student Alice Fraasa became a minor internet celebrity after modelling for the company's online advertisements.

History
The company was started during 2004 by two brothers in Atlanta, Georgia. Matt Walls is the president of the company, and his brother Bryan Walls is in charge of the designs. The business grew rapidly, becoming profitable within a year, and earning SnorgTees the number 6 rank on the Bulldog 100, which is a list of the fastest growing companies owned by University of Georgia alumni.

See also
Busted Tees
Headline Shirts
T Shirt Hell

References

External links
Official Website

Clothing brands of the United States
T-shirts
Companies based in Roswell, Georgia